Showy goldenrod is a common name for several plants and may refer to:

Solidago erecta, native to the eastern United States, formerly treated as a variety of Solidago speciosa
Solidago speciosa, native to the eastern United States
Solidago spectabilis, native to the Great Basin region of the western United States